Jhoom Barabar Jhoom is a 2007 Indian Hindi-language musical romantic comedy film directed by Shaad Ali and produced by Aditya Chopra under Yash Raj Films. Based on a story by Ali and a script by Habib Faisal, the film stars Abhishek Bachchan, Preity Zinta, Bobby Deol and Lara Dutta. Amitabh Bachchan makes a special appearance. The film released on 15 June 2007.

Plot 
The film begins with a mysterious Romani gypsy-like musician (Amitabh Bachchan) leading the crowds at Waterloo Station in London in a dance to the title song.

At the station, two strangers, Rakesh “Rikki” Thakkral (Abhishek Bachchan) and Alvira Khan (Preity Zinta), wait for their respective fiancés arriving on the same train. Rikki is a fun-loving Punjabi from Bathinda who lives in Southall, while Alvira is a sexy, elite class Pakistani from Lahore who is more assimilated into British culture. The two share a table in a café together and to kill the time they talk about how they met their partners-to-be.

Rikki says that he met his fiancé, Anaida Raza, at Hôtel Ritz Paris, the same night that Diana, Princess of Wales and Dodi Al-Fayed left the hotel to take their last journey together. Rikki explains "When two lovers die, another two are born", as he fell in love with Anaida that night. Alvira says she met her fiancé, the dashing lawyer Steve Singh, at Madame Tussauds in London when he saved her from a falling Superman wax model. The encounter changed her life and she was smitten by the lawyer who also helped her sue Madame Tussauds for substantial damages.

As Rikki and Alvira talk they begin to enjoy each other's company and their different backgrounds cease to matter. They exchange numbers and go to meet their partners.

However, it is then revealed that they had not gone to meet their respective partners. Rikki is in fact at the train station to meet his business partner, while Alvira is meeting her relatives. As they leave the station separately, they realise they are in love but believe their love is unrequited, each of the other.

The two get in touch when Alvira calls Rikki, pretending it was a wrong number. They decide to meet up at a disco where there is a dance competition but both try to maintain that they are engaged. Out of desperation, Rikki hires Laila (Lara Dutta), a prostitute, to pose as Anaida, and Alvira fools and then blackmails a co-worker Satvinder (Bobby Deol) to pretend to be Steve. The four meet at a club and take part in the dance competition while throwing insults at each other. Rikki and Laila emerge as the winners but Alvira is jealous and storms out in tears.

Satvinder goes to Rikki's flat and tells him that he has fallen in love with Laila. He also tells him that Alvira is not engaged to him. Rikki, realising what has happened, goes to see Alvira, who is at first moping in bed and later tries to convince her cousin not to marry her. Rikki calls her from a neighbour's window. Then they confront each other and confess that they love each other and start to date while Satvinder and Laila go to Hollywood.

The film ends with the mysterious gypsy musician showing how Rikki and Alvira invented the stories about their non-existent lovers by taking inspiration from Alvira's newspaper and Rikki's comic book.

Cast 
 Abhishek Bachchan as Rakesh "Rikki" Thakral
 Preity Zinta as Alvira Khan
 Bobby Deol as Satvinder "Steve" Singh
 Lara Dutta as Anaida Raza / Laila
 Amitabh Bachchan as man singing at the train station (Special Appearance)
 Piyush Mishra as Hafeez Huffy Bhai
 Ameet Chana as Shahriyar
 Meera Syal as Satvinder's mother
 Sanjeev Bhaskar as Shopkeeper
 Sagar Arya as Neil
 Sudhir

Production 
Pre-production of the film began in 2005, during the making of Bunty Aur Babli. Abhishek Bachchan was the first actor to be cast in the film. The working title was Sangam Mein. Vidya Balan and John Abraham were first approached for the roles of Anaida Raza and Steve Singh. When they refused, Dutta and Deol were roped in. Amitabh Bachchan has been credited with a special appearance in the film.

Shooting began in the second half of 2006 in London and included a shooting schedule in Paris, France. Many images from the set show shooting being conducted at Waterloo station, London. Some shooting took place in Agra, near the Taj Mahal. The choreography has been done by Vaibhavi Merchant. Filming has taken place in numerous locations along Green Lanes, Harringay in North London.

Abhishek Bachchan and Bobby Deol worked together for the first time in this film. Their fathers Amitabh Bachchan and Dharmendra had worked together in the Bollywood classic Sholay (1975). The film features a scene in which they travel in a scooter like their fathers had done in Sholay, only this time Bobby Deol is driving and Abhishek Bachchan is on the passenger seat. The film reunites Bobby Deol and Preity Zinta who starred in Soldier (1998) as well as Abhishek Bachchan and Lara Dutta who co-starred in Mumbai Se Aaya Mera Dost (2003).

Some filming took place in Stamford Bridge stadium, home to Chelsea F.C. It was announced in September 2006 that the Chelsea football team would be part of the film, but this scene did not appear in the completed film.

Release 
Jhoom Barabar Jhoom's teaser trailer was released along with Ta Ra Rum Pum, which released on 27 April 2007.

Soundtrack

Development
This is the third directorial venture of Shaad Ali, and second with Shankar–Ehsaan–Loy, after the crime comedy Bunty Aur Babli (2005). The album has a dhol-oriented sound. Santoor, sarangi and flute were used for the melody "Bol Na Halke Halke" and Mahalakshmi Iyer has sung in a lower key. "Ticket to Hollywood" has a hip hop feel to it, while "Kiss of Love" is a zingy and rambunctious. "JBJ" is the techno song during the climax scenes of the movie, which is picturised on Abhishek Bachchan, Preity Zinta, Bobby Deol and Lara Dutta. "Jhoom Jam" is the only instrumental in the album, which as title suggests, is the 'jam of the instrumental version of all track of the album.

Release history
The soundtrack of the film was released on 8 March 2007 by Yash Raj Music in various formats including music cassette, MP3 files, audio CD, and the DVD-Audio.

Track list
All lyrics were written by Gulzar.

Reception

The soundtrack garnered highly positive reviews from critics.

Joginder Tuteja of Bollywood Hungama said, Jhoom Barabar Jhoom is an album that has chartbuster written on it in bold letters. There are some albums that take time to register with music lovers. There are some that require the strong word of mouth to carry them forward. There are some which are destined to be popular in the very first listening. Jhoom Barabar Jhoom of course belongs to the last category. Sukanya Verma of Rediff described the album as high on melody, entertainment and attitude. Gianysh Toolsee of Planet Bollywood in his review, stated, "S-E-L successfully manage to hit the bull's eye with their proper use of zingy sounds, effective arrangements, lively tunes, rhythmic variations and groovy beats." "S-E-L, the most prolific composers of last year maintains their golden streak of success with Jhoom Barabar Jhoom", said the GlamSham review. Sanjay Ram of Businessofcinema.com stated that the album is positively a must-buy.

The album featured in the list of "Top 10 Soundtracks of 2007" by Bollywood Hungama and Rediff.

Chart performance
The music for the film entered the charts at #6 and in its second week climbed to #5. By the first week of July, the album topped the music charts and stayed there for 2 weeks. Despite the poor response to the film, the music received high acclaim. On the week beginning 23 July, the album was placed at #3. On the week beginning 17 September, the soundtrack dropped to #10. According to the Indian trade website Box Office India, with around  units sold, this film's soundtrack album was the year's fourth highest-selling.

Reception

Box office 
The film opened to a 65–80%response, which was below expectations for a Yash Raj film. As per IBOS, the film has opened to a good response and has taken the biggest opening of the year at the box office.

The film did achieve the 90%+ response at some places, such as Punjab and Haryana. The film had opened well in big cities such as Mumbai with a 75% turnout and Delhi which had a 70% turnout. In the south, it opened to a poor response due to the release of the Tamil film Sivaji. However, all the big theatres reached to a 90%+ response with many being 100%.

The film's international box office performance was considered to be average. In its first week, the film made £264,347 and debuted at #6 in the UK charts. In the US, the film debuted at #16 on the film chart making $455,257 in its first week. In Australia, the film made $91,485 debuting at #10. The film had made Rs. 190–200 million in its first week and debuted at #1 but the collections began to fall from the second week. The film had done better in the UK than in the US. As of 27 June, the film was positioned at #9 on the UK charts and at #21 on the U.S chart. The film was a moderate box-office success. but the collections began to fall. In the UK, the film had performed well. Box Office India declared the film as "Average".

Reviews 
Jhoom Barabar Jhoom received mixed reviews upon release, with praise for its music, visuals and cinematography, and criticism for its screenplay and the performances of the cast.

Indicine.com rated the film at 4 out 5, saying the movie is a fun ride and is well worth the ticket money. It is the kind of movie that can wash away your blues. Taran Adarsh of indiafm.com gave the film a 1.5 out of 5 rating, saying the film is all gloss, no substance. The performances of the lead actors received mixed reviews with Taran Adarsh saying that the film belongs to Abhishek first, and Preity next. Hindustantimes.com gave the film 2 stars, as did Glamsham.com, with the latter praising the performances of the cast. Sanjay Ram of businessofcinema.com  gave the film 2 out of 5 stars and said "though Jhoom Barabar Jhoom offers the colour, it is all but a short-story stretched."  Moviewallah.com gave the film 2 out of 5 stars but praised the performances to a certain extent. BollywoodArchive.com gave the film 2.5 out of 5 stars says it's a good light-hearted entertainer with good music from Shankar-Ehsaan-Loy.

See also 
List of films set in London

References

External links 
 
 

2007 films
2000s Hindi-language films
Indian romantic musical films
Films set in London
Films shot in London
Films shot in India
Films set in Paris
Yash Raj Films films
Films directed by Shaad Ali